Hermitage was the name of a community located in southeastern Pointe Coupee Parish, Louisiana, United States. The community was located along the Mississippi River, near the Pointe Coupee - West Baton Rouge Parish line.

History
The town was named for the home of President Andrew Jackson.  A post office was established at the river community in 1851.  L. P. Day owned and operated a store in the community before and during the American Civil War.  Shortly after World War II, the post office was closed.

References

Geography of Pointe Coupee Parish, Louisiana
Baton Rouge metropolitan area
Unincorporated communities in Louisiana